Statue rubbing is the act of touching a part of a public statue. Popular among tourists, it is a form of superstition that is believed to bring good luck, ensure a return to the city, improve love life or make a wish come true.

The parts that are supposed to be rubbed are usually the most protruding or characteristic ones, for example noses or feet. In Springfield, Illinois, at Lincoln's Tomb, rubbing the nose of Honest Abe's large bust is good luck. Some of those superstitions also involve touching breasts or genitalia of the person depicted on the statue – this is usually supposed to bring luck in love or improve fertility. One example is the Statue of Juliet in Verona.

Rubbing statues can have negative effects on them as it causes erosion. Because of that some well-known statues had to be replaced with a replica and some places discourage or ban tourists from doing it. It is also possible to acquire a bacterial infection from touching statues.

Notable examples 

 Rubbing the testicles of the Charging Bull in New York for good luck
 Rubbing the snout of the Porcellino statue in Florence and putting a coin in its mouth for good luck
 Rubbing the breasts of the Molly Malone statue in Dublin to bring luck
 Rubbing the breast of the Juliet statue in Verona to bring luck in love
 Rubbing the crotch of the Monument of Victor Noir on the Pere Lachaise Cemetery, kissing his lips and leaving flowers in his hat to improve woman's love life and fertility
 Rubbing or kissing the right foot of the Saint Peter statue in Vatican to have the prayers heard
 Rubbing the arm of Everard t'Serclaes statue in Brussels, as well as the angel's face, the dog's face and the one of the shields to make a wish come true
 Rubbing the left foot of the Timothy Eaton statue in Winnipeg to bring good luck
Rubbing the toes of the Statue of Margaret Thatcher and the Statue of Winston Churchill in the British Parliament.

Similarly rubbing the belly of any statue depicting Budai is said to bring good luck. This custom might have originated from the Laughing Buddha statue in the Lingyin Temple.

Similar rituals 

 Kissing the Blarney Stone in Blarney, Ireland to endow the kisser with the gift of the gab. Because of the location of the stone it can only be done while leaning backwards, usually with a help of an assistant.
 Putting the hand inside Bocca della Verità mask in Rome which is said to work as a lie detector. Tourists make a statement while holding their hand inside the mask. If they told the truth, the hand comes unscathed, but if they lied, the mouth supposedly bites the hand off.
 Standing on top of one of the mascarons near the entrance to the Franciscan Church in Dubrovnik, taking off the shirt and putting it back on while maintaining balance to bring luck in love.

See also 

 Wishing well
 Love lock

References 

Superstitions
Statues
Tourist activities